Balık ekmek (IPA: Ba'lɯk ek'mek) is a common street food item in Turkish cuisine.  It is a sandwich of a filet of fried or grilled fish (typically mackerel, or other similar oily fish), served along with various vegetables, inside a bun of Turkish  bread.  It is typically served on the Eminönü square straight from the boat on which it is prepared.

The name is a combination of the Turkish words balık (fish) and ekmek (bread).

See also
 Fischbrötchen
 Street food
 Turkish cuisine
 Regional street food: Istanbul

External links
 "A Sandwich A Day: Balık Ekmek in Istanbul" 

Seafood sandwiches
Turkish sandwiches
Street food in Turkey